XHSE-FM is a radio station on 100.1 FM in Acapulco, Guerrero. It carries the La Mejor grupera format of its owner, MVS Radio.

History
XHSE received its concession on August 2, 1969. It has always been owned by MVS.

References

Radio stations in Guerrero
Radio stations established in 1969
MVS Radio